The Queens Chapel Road Line, designated Route R4, is a daily bus route operated by the Washington Metropolitan Area Transit Authority between the Highview Apartment Complex in Hyattsville, Maryland and Brookland–CUA station of the Red Line of the Washington Metro. The line operates every 20–35 minutes during peak hours, 70 minutes during midday service and 65–70 minutes on the weekends. R4 trips are roughly 30 minutes.

Background 
Route R4 operates daily between Brookland–CUA station and Highview, via Bunker Hill Road NE (towards Highview), 10th Street NE (towards the Brookland-CUA station), Perry Street NE (towards the Brookland-CUA station, Michigan Avenue NE, Queens Chapel Road, Ager Road, the West Hyattsville station, Ager Road, Hamilton Street, Queens Chapel Road, Belcrest Road, the Hyattsville Crossing station, East - West Highway (towards Highview), Belcrest Road, Toledo Terrace, Northwest Drive, Dean Drive, and Highview Terrace.

During light or moderate snowfall detours, route R4 would terminate at Hyattsville Crossing station with no service operating to Highview. The route would be suspended if heavy snowfall occurs.

Route R4 currently operates out of the Bladensburg Metrobus Division.

Route R4 stops

History

Early History

DC Transit Routes G5 and G7, originally operated on the Queens Chapel Road corridor, between Highview and Bureau of Engraving (G5)/Potomac Park (G7) in Downtown Washington D.C. In addition, the G9 also operated on the Queens Chapel Road corridor between the Prince George's Plaza Shopping Center and Potomac Park in Downtown Washington D.C., as well. All three routes would only operate during weekday peak hours only. All three DC Transit Routes routes began service in 1958 and would later end up becoming WMATA Metrobus Routes on February 4, 1973, when WMATA bought out all four bus companies that operated throughout the Washington D.C. Metropolitan Area and merged them all together to form its own, "Metrobus" System.

The G5, G7, and G9 routes kept operating all the way up until they ended up being discontinued February 19, 1978 and replaced by Metrobus Routes R2, R4, R6, and R7 after the Brookland-CUA station opened on February 6, 1978.

Routes R2, R4, R6, and R7 originally operated as part of the former DC Transit, Rosslyn Line, alongside routes R1, R5, R8, and R9, between Rosslyn (R2), Crystal City (R4), and various other points in Virginia, and Potomac Park in Downtown Washington D.C., prior to February 4, 1973, before becoming WMATA Metrobus Routes. At some point between this time and the year of 1975 R2 was rerouted to operate between the Kennedy Center in Downtown Washington D.C. and Calverton, Maryland, and no longer operate anywhere in Virginia anymore. Routes R1 and R5 were discontinued during this time as well, while Routes R4, R6, R7, R8, and R9 stopped operating in Virginia, as of February 19, 1978. R2 would be the main, daily route on the that would operate seven days a week, while Routes R4, R6, & R7 mainly operated during weekday rush hour/peak period times only.

On February 19, 1978, Route R2 was truncated to only operate between the Brookland–CUA station and Calverton, via Bunker Hill Road NE, 10th Street NE, Perry Street NE (towards the Brookland - CUA station), Michigan Avenue NE, Queens Chapel Road, Belcrest Road, the Prince George's Plaza Shopping Center, Toledo Road, Adelphi Road, Campus Drive/the University of Maryland College Park Campus, Baltimore Avenue, Rhode Island Avenue, Powder Mill Road, Cherry Hill Road, Broadbirch Drive, Calverton Boulevard, Beltsville Drive, and Beltsville Road, during the day. Route H6 would replace R2's former routing between the Brookland-CUA station and Kennedy Center, during the times Metrorail service was available. However; R2 would still continue to make trips to the Kennedy Center when Metrorail was closed.

Route R4 was rerouted to operate between Brookland–CUA station and Hyattsville, via the exact same routing as Route R2 between the Brookland-CUA station and intersection of Queens Chapel Road & Hamilton Street in Hyattsville, and then operate via G4's former loop in Hyattsville, via Hamilton Street, 38th Avenue, Jefferson Street, 42nd Avenue, Farrugut Street, Baltimore Avenue, Gallatin Street, and Hamilton Street.

Route R6 was rerouted to operate between Brookland–CUA station & Lewisdale, via th same routing as Route R2 between the Brookland-CUA station and intersection of Queens Chapel Road & Ager Road in Hyattsville, and then divert off Queens Chapel Road onto the intersection of Ager Road, and then operate via the former Route E6's Ager Road-Rhode Island Avenue Line Lewisdale Loop, via 23rd Avenue, Lewisdale Drive, Fordham Street, and 23rd Avenue.

Route R7, was rerouted to operate between Brookland-CUA station and Highview. R7 would operate on the exact same routing as Route R2, between the Brookland–CUA station and Prince George's Plaza Shopping Center, and then operate via the former G5 and G7's routing via Belcrest Road, Northwest Drive, Dean Drive, and Highview Terrace.

All Routes would be eliminated in Virginia as a result.

As Metrorail service began to become more available all Route R2 service to Kennedy Center was eliminated and all service was cutback to Brookland–CUA station, while H6 would completely replace the segment of its routing between the Brookland-CUA station & Kennedy Center altogether.

Service Simplification
On December 11, 1993, when West Hyattsville and Prince George's Plaza stations opened, Route R6 was discontinued and both the R2 and R7 Metrobus Route were rerouted/shifted to operate as part of the "Riggs Road Line" between the Fort Totten station and Calverton, alongside the reincarnated Route R1 and R5, in order to replace the former Routes R8 and R9 that were discontinued.

As a result, Route R4 was rerouted to operated between the Brookland-CUA station and Highview, instead of operating up to Hyattsville. Route R4 would operate on its usual routing between the Brookland-CUA station and intersection of Queens Chapel Road & Ager Road, then divert off Queens Chapel Road, onto the intersection of Ager Road in order to serve the newly opened West Hyattsville station, before returning onto Queens Chapel Road, via Ager Road and Hamilton Street, and then operating via the exact same routing as Route R7, between the intersection of Queens Chapel Road & Hamilton Street and Highview, via Queens Chapel Road, Belcrest Road, the Prince George's Plaza Shopping Center, Belcrest Road, Toledo Terrace, Northwest Drive, Dean Drive, and Highview Terrace, via Prince George's Plaza station in between, replacing the former segment of Routes R2, R6, & R7's routing between Brookland-CUA station and the intersection of Queens Chapel Road & Ager Road, Route R2 & R7's routing between the intersection of Queens Chapel Road & Hamilton Street and Prince George's Plaza Shopping Center, and Route R7's former routing between the Prince George's Plaza Shopping Center and Highview. A New Route R3 replaced Route R6's segment in Lewisdale while Routes 86, C2, F6. and F8 replaced portions of the former R2 routing.

Also, Route R4's former routing in Hyattsville between the intersection of Hamilton Street & Queens Chapel Road and Jefferson Street & 42nd Avenue, via Hamilton Street, 38th Avenue, and Jefferson Street was completely taken over by Route F8 while the R4's former Hyattsville loop, via 42nd Avenue, Farrugut Street, Baltimore Avenue, and Gallatin Street, was eventually replaced by Prince George's County TheBus Route 13 im 1996.

Later Years
On May 15, 2003, the former Metrobus bus bays in front of the former G.C. Murphy store inside Prince George's Plaza, were demolished in order to build a new Target store. Route R4 stopped directing entering into and looping inside the Prince George's Plaza.

When the site of where the new Mosaic Apartments next to Prince George's Plaza station, were being built, route R4 was rerouted to operate along East West Highway and turning onto Belcrest Road going to Highview from Prince George's Plaza station due to the construction. Southbound service to Brookland station was unaffected by the change.

During the COVID-19 pandemic, Route R4 was reduced to operate on its Saturday supplemental schedule beginning on March 16, 2020. However, on March 18, 2020, the route was further reduced to operate on its Sunday schedule and weekend service later suspended on March 21, 2020. A modified schedule and all weekend service resumed on August 23, 2020.

References 

R4